The Canton of Aubigny-sur-Nère is a canton situated in the Cher département and in the Centre-Val de Loire region of France.

Geography 
An area of forestry and farming in the valley of the river Nère, in the northeastern part of the arrondissement of Vierzon, centred on the town of Aubigny-sur-Nère. The altitude varies from 131m at Ménétréol-sur-Sauldre to 326m at Oizon, with an average altitude of 191m.

Composition 
At the French canton reorganisation which came into effect in March 2015, the canton was expanded from 4 to 15 communes:
 
Argent-sur-Sauldre
Aubigny-sur-Nère
Blancafort
Brinon-sur-Sauldre
La Chapelle-d'Angillon
Clémont
Ennordres
Ivoy-le-Pré
Ménétréol-sur-Sauldre
Méry-ès-Bois
Nançay
Neuvy-sur-Barangeon
Oizon
Presly
Sainte-Montaine

Population

See also 
 Arrondissements of the Cher department
 Cantons of the Cher department
 Communes of the Cher department

References

Aubigny-sur-Nere